Richard Yagutilov,  Also known as YOUGOTTALOVE (Born September 7, 1976 in Russia) is a photographer and filmmaker who works in the fields of advertising, music, fashion, and portraiture and is known for his stylized and colorful imagery.

Career

Yagutilov A.K.A. YOUGOTTALOVE has several short films credited to him ("Hate", "Numb", "CoffeeShop", "Park Pleasures") as well as several music videos for urban artists including Kardinal Offishall, and tour video for Lady Gaga.

YOUGOTTALOVE worked with Canadian Hip Hop Artist Kardinal Offishall on his 2008 album Not 4 Sale. He is credited as photographer and Cover Designer for the artist's barcode concept album cover. Richard also worked with pop star Lady Gaga as videographer for her Canadian club tour "video diaries".

Richard's work has been described as a surreal assault on the senses. His use of color and contrast as an added character  to his images.

Motion pictures

Short films:
2000 Hate
2001 Numb
2002 Coffeeshop
2003 Balls Out
2004 Park Pleasures

Music videos:
2005 Heads Up - Kardinal Offishall
2006 Take it Easy - Brass Munk
2006 Game Tight - Tre Nice
2007 Hype - Trinity Chris
2007 Candyman - Richie Henessey
2007 Damned If I - Tebey
2008 E.O.S - Smoke That Chronic
2008 Burnt - Kardinal Offishall

Awards

2000
 E.V.A Award at The International Television Association for short film “Hate”

2001
 Grand Prize for Best Independent Short film in the Niagara Indi Film festival for “Numb”

2004
 Gold Remy Award at WorldFest Houston for dramatic short film “Park Pleasures”

2007
 Outstanding Achievement in Photography by The International society of Photographers

2008
 Video of the year at The Marijuana Music Awards for E.O.S “Smoke That Chronic”

Photography

Applied Arts award: "Nike Lights"

PhotoLife Magazine: Emerging Photographers list

Privilege Magazine: T.I.F.F Celebrity Schmooze

Canadian Musician: Cover and feature spread "Kardinal Offishall, NOT4SALE"

External links
Photographer's home page

Richard Yagutilov on Myspace
Deviant art Gallery

1976 births
Living people
Russian photographers